Amolakh Chand (1907-1963) was an Indian politician. He was a Member of Parliament  representing Uttar Pradesh in the Rajya Sabha the upper house of India's Parliament as a member of the Indian National Congress.

References

Rajya Sabha members from Uttar Pradesh
Indian National Congress politicians from Uttar Pradesh
1907 births
1963 deaths